Gordon Charles Redahl (August 28, 1935 — June 22, 2011) was a Canadian professional ice hockey left winger who played 18 games in the National Hockey League for the Boston Bruins during the 1958–59. The rest of his career, which lasted from 1954 to 1970, was mainly spent in the minor Western Hockey League. He died in Flin Flon, Manitoba in 2011.

Career statistics

Regular season and playoffs

References

External links

1935 births
2011 deaths
Boston Bruins players
Calgary Stampeders (WHL) players
Canadian ice hockey forwards
Denver Invaders players
Denver Spurs (WHL) players
Flin Flon Bombers players
Ice hockey people from Saskatchewan
Phoenix Roadrunners (WHL) players
Pittsburgh Hornets players
Providence Reds players
Rochester Americans players
Saskatoon Quakers players
San Francisco Seals (ice hockey) players
Victoria Maple Leafs players
Winnipeg Warriors (minor pro) players